Ivan is a 2017 Slovenian drama film directed by Janez Burger. It was selected as the Slovenian entry for the Best Foreign Language Film at the 91st Academy Awards, but it was not nominated.

Cast
 Marusa Majer as Mara
 Matjaz Tribuson as Rok
 Natasa Barbara Gracner as Socialna delavka

Financing and production 
The project is estimated at 1,478,500 euros. It was supported by the Slovenian Film Center (€575,000), RTV Slovenia (€195,800), the Croatian Audiovisual Center (€755,870 or approx. €99,358) and Eurimages (€167,426). Technical services were provided by FS Viba film (€191,350).

See also
 List of submissions to the 91st Academy Awards for Best Foreign Language Film
 List of Slovenian submissions for the Academy Award for Best Foreign Language Film

References

External links
 

2017 films
2017 drama films
Slovene-language films
2010s Italian-language films
Slovenian drama films
2017 multilingual films